Prietržka is a village and municipality in Skalica District in the Trnava Region of western Slovakia.

History 
In historical records the village was first mentioned in 1392.

Geography 
The municipality lies at an altitude of 177 metres and covers an area of 4.696 km2. It has a population of about 452 people.

References

External links 

 Official page
 http://www.statistics.sk/mosmis/eng/run.html

Villages and municipalities in Skalica District